Indian Japanese or Japanese Indian may be:
India–Japan relations
Japanese people in India
Japanese language education in India
Indians in Japan